The Balmoral oil field is a depleted crude oil field in the UK sector of the central North Sea, 225 km north-east of Aberdeen. Oil was produced from the field reservoir by the Balmoral Floating Production Vessel (FPV) between 1986 and 2020. The Balmoral FPV also processed oil from six minor oil fields in the area. Oil production from the field has ceased.

The field 
The Balmoral oil field is located in Block 16/21 of the UK North Sea continental shelf. The reservoir and its fluids have the following characteristics:

Owners and operators 
The joint venture owners of the field in 1994 were Sun Oil Britain Ltd (62.0%), Deminex UK Oil and Gas Ltd (15.0%), Clyde Expro plc (15.0%), Pentex Oil Limited (8.0%). Sun Oil operated the Balmoral field.  In 2004 Canadian Natural Resources (CNR) acquired a 70.2% interest in the field; in 2007 Oilexco acquired the stake from CNR; in 2009 Premier Oil E&P UK Ltd acquired Oilexco and Premier Oil becomes the operator of the Balmoral field.

Development 
The Balmoral field was developed by a single custom built integrated production and accommodation semi-submersible vessel. The principal design data of the Balmoral FPV was as follows.

Small oil fields in the vicinity of Balmoral were developed with subsea wellheads. Well fluids were transported by pipeline from the wells to the Balmoral FPV for treatment and export.

Processing plant 
Oil from the wellheads was routed to two stages of 3-phase (oil, gas, water) separators where gas and water were removed. Oil was metered and pumped via a 14.5 km 14-inch diameter flexible riser and pipeline to a tie-in on the Brae–Forties trunk line and thence to Cruden Bay.

The peak production from Balmoral was 1.71 million tonnes per year in 1987. In 1991 the production rate was 35,000 bpd.

Gas from the separators was compressed and used as fuel gas and lift gas for a number of wells.

Water injection facilities for up to 100,000 bpd were provided to maintain reservoir pressure through six injection wells.

Decommissioning 
A Cessation of Production application was received from the Oil and Gas Authority on 23 April 2018.  Premier Oil prepared a decommissioning plan. Production from Balmoral ceased on 28 November 2020. The FPV was flushed to remove hydrocarbon. It was removed from the field in May 2021 and was taken to Denmark for dismantling and recycling of materials.

References 

North Sea oil fields
North Sea
Oil fields of Scotland
Oil fields of the United Kingdom